Eleanor Jessie Coppola (née Neil; born May 4, 1936) is an American documentary filmmaker, artist, and writer. She is married to director Francis Ford Coppola. She is most known for her 1991 documentary film Hearts of Darkness: A Filmmaker's Apocalypse as well as other documentaries chronicling the films of her husband and children. Coppola lives on her family's winery in Napa Valley, California.

Early life
Eleanor Coppola was born Eleanor Jessie Neil, on May 4, 1936, in Los Angeles, California. Her father was a political cartoonist for the Los Angeles Examiner who died when she was 10 years old. She and her brothers were raised by their mother, Delphine Neil (née Lougheed) in Sunset Beach, California. She graduated from UCLA with a degree in applied design and was a member of the women's fraternity Alpha Chi Omega (Alpha Psi chapter).

While working on the set of the 1962 horror film Dementia 13, she met her future husband Francis Ford Coppola. Her position was assistant art director, while Coppola was making his directorial debut with the film. The couple had been dating for several months when Eleanor discovered in 1963 that she was pregnant. Initially Eleanor considered giving the baby up for adoption, but was convinced otherwise by Francis Ford Coppola. The couple married in Las Vegas on February 2, 1963, and gave birth to their first son Gian-Carlo Coppola. Years later, Eleanor gave birth to Roman and Sofia Coppola.

Film career
Eleanor has been a constant presence on films directed by her famous family members. Her film contribution consists of mainly documentaries in which she has acted as director, cinematographer, videographer, and writer.

Many of her documentaries consist of behind-the-scenes looks at such films as Marie Antoinette, which was directed by her daughter Sofia Coppola. In her documentaries, Eleanor captures the struggles that have endangered her family's films even before they made it onto the big screen. Through her film work, Eleanor Coppola is able to illustrate not only what goes into a film financially, but also capture the emotional toll filmmaking has on the individuals on and off the camera.

Apocalypse Now
For her early film career, Eleanor Coppola spent much of her time accompanying her husband on his film shoots. In 1976, she began documenting the making of Coppola's war film Apocalypse Now. Her recordings of the hectic film process were later released in her memoir Notes on the Making of Apocalypse Now in 1979. The book chronicled such events as the near destruction of the film's production as well as the stress that both cast and crew were suffering from at the time. This would not be the only documentation of the making of Francis Ford Coppola's Apocalypse Now as she decided to film a documentary based on the same movie.

The documentary film Hearts of Darkness: A Filmmaker's Apocalypse was co-directed by Eleanor Coppola, Fax Bahr, and George Hickenlooper. In the film, Eleanor narrates the trials and difficulties surrounding the production of the award-winning film as not only problems arose with the studio but also the cast and crew working at the time. Such events caught on camera include the nervous breakdown of the film's lead Martin Sheen as well as the trouble facing Francis Ford Coppola when an expensive set was destroyed.

The documentary film was released in 1991, which went on to win several awards such as the Emmy for "Outstanding Individual Achievement – Informational Programming – Directing". The film was also nominated for a Directors Guild of America (DGA) Documentary Award in 1991.

Feature filmmaking
Coppola made her feature film directorial debut with the 2016 romantic comedy Paris Can Wait starring Diane Lane as a wealthy film producer's wife and Arnaud Viard as a charming Frenchman who drives her from Cannes to Paris. The film premiered at the 2016 Toronto International Film Festival.

In 2020, Coppola released her second feature film, Love Is Love Is Love, a set of intertwined love stories about three couples.

Writer
Eleanor Coppola has written two successful books. Her first book, Notes on the Making of Apocalypse Now, recorded the film's journey from 1976 to 1979. Her detailed note-taking continued in other areas of her life as she collected and wrote about her life's major events. With notes covering a thirty-year time span, Eleanor would go on to write the book Notes on a Life.

Notes on a Life
The memoir Notes on a Life follows thirty years of Eleanor Coppola's life as she juggles raising children and being there for Francis as he directs films that move the family from place to place. The book consists of short passages from each day beginning with the death of her oldest son Gian-Carlo Coppola at the age of 22 and the birth of her granddaughter Gia just months later. The death of Gian-Carlo Coppola serves as a constant refrain throughout the entire book.

The book is told through her own point of view and although she mentions certain events concerning those around her, such as the controversy surrounding Francis' decision to cast Sofia in The Godfather Part III, her memoir chronicles the inner struggles and problems the family faced at the time.

Filmography
{| class="wikitable sortable"
|-
! Year !! Film !! Role(s)
|-
| 1962 || Dementia 13|| Assistant art director
|-
| 1991|| Hearts of Darkness: A Filmmaker's Apocalypse || Director  
|-
| 1996 || A Visit to China's Miao Country || Director 
|-
| 2002 || On the Set of 'CQ''' || Videographer
|-
| 2002 || Teknolust || Second camera operator
|-
| 2006 || A Million Feet of Film: The Editing of Apocalypse Now || Cinematographer
|-
| 2006 || Heard Any Good Movies Lately?: The Sound Design of Apocalypse Now || Cinematographer
|-
| 2006 || The Birth of 5.1 Sound || Cinematographer
|-
| 2006 || The Music of Apocalypse Now || Cinematographer
|-
| 2007 || The Making of 'Marie Antoinette || Director
|-
| 2007 || Francis Ford Coppola Directs 'John Grisham's The Rainmaker' || Director
|-
| 2007 || Coda: Thirty Years Later|| Director, cinematographer, writer
|-
| 2016 || Paris Can Wait || Director, writer
|-
| 2020 || Love Is Love Is Love || Director, writer
|}

Other work
The organization Circle of Memory was founded by Eleanor Coppola and other artists to commemorate missing and lost loved ones. Her artwork has been featured in museums and galleries around the world. Eleanor Coppola founded the project in memory of her late son Gian-Carlo Coppola. Eleanor Coppola has also designed costumes for the Oberlin Dance Company. She also manages the Rubicon Estate Winery that her family owns.

BibliographyNotes on the Making of Apocalypse Now by Eleanor CoppolaNotes on a Life'' by Eleanor Coppola

See also
 Coppola family tree
 List of female film and television directors

References

External links
 Interview with Ms. Coppola
 
 Rubicon Estate Winery
 Coppola's Windows (1973) on SFMOMA Open Space

1936 births
American cinematographers
American film producers
American women cinematographers
American women film directors
American women screenwriters
Artists from Los Angeles
Eleanor
Living people
UCLA School of the Arts and Architecture alumni
Writers from Los Angeles
Film directors from Los Angeles
Screenwriters from California
American women film producers